The 1997 Edmonton Eskimos, coached by Ron Lancaster, finished in 1st place in the West Division with a 12–6 record. They were upset in the West Final by the Saskatchewan Roughriders.

Offseason

CFL Draft

Ottawa Roughriders Dispersal Draft

Preseason

Schedule

Regular season

Season standings 
East Division

West Division

Season schedule

1997 CFL All-Stars

Offence 
 SB – Darren Flutie, Edmonton Eskimos

Defence 
 LB – Willie Pless, Edmonton Eskimos
 CB – Kavis Reed, Edmonton Eskimos
 DB – Glenn Rogers Jr., Edmonton Eskimos

Western All-Star Selections

Offence 
 SB – Darren Flutie, Edmonton Eskimos
 OG – Leo Groenewegen, Edmonton Eskimos
 OT – Thomas Rayam, Edmonton Eskimos

Defence 
 DT – Bennie Goods, Edmonton Eskimos
 DE – Malvin Hunter, Edmonton Eskimos
 LB – Willie Pless, Edmonton Eskimos
 CB – Kavis Reed, Edmonton Eskimos
 DB – Glenn Rogers Jr., Edmonton Eskimos
 DS – Trent Brown, Edmonton Eskimos

Special teams 
 ST – Gizmo Williams, Edmonton Eskimos

Playoffs

West Final 

Edmonton Elks seasons
1997 in Alberta
1997 Canadian Football League season by team